The Chehalis Theater is a single-screen, Art Deco movie theater in Chehalis, Washington.  The theater is at the north end of the Chehalis Historic Downtown District near the Washington Hotel. Known locally for the hand-painted illustrations of popular children's fantasy characters on the its ceiling, it is the only surviving movie house in the city.

History
The building was constructed in 1923 and was originally named the Beau Arts Building. First home to a Ford car dealership, the location became known as St. John's Garage and the Chehalis Garage. After the structure was renovated to become a movie house, it opened on December 7, 1938, as the Pix Theater, seating 653; the first film shown was Bob Hope's Thanks for the Memory. Before the Chehalis Theater, the city's early film showings took place at the St. Helens Hotel or the Dream Theater in the Washington Hotel.

Typically shown at the theater during this time would be a sequence of newsreels, cartoons, and westerns.

It was named Chehalis Theater in 1954 after a brief renovation. Films would be projected until 1988 when, due to economic hardships and maintenance backlogs, the theater shut down and became a video rental store named Video Time. After the theater was sold in 1994, it hosted a flea market. There were brief periods of screening films into 2008, including some new releases, when the location ceased operations until 2016 due to competition with a larger, upgraded cinema at the Lewis County Mall.

2016 and 2018 renovations

The first renovation began in 2016 after a new owner leased the building to a local proprietor. The restorations focused on reviving and saving much of the Art Deco style, while adding an upstairs bar, dining area, and kitchen.  The theater began film showings, and added musical acts and screenings of Seattle Seahawks games for residents.

In late 2018, a new lease agreement with a local Chehalis family led to additional renovations. The owners continued to screen movies and provide live musical entertainment while concentrating on pizza as the main cuisine option.

2021 renovations
In 2020, a local restaurateur bought the theater and started the third restoration in five years in 2021.  With plans to reopen later that year or early 2022, it is expected to continue to screen movies while providing restaurant dining and live entertainment. Adhering to ADA requirements and new building codes, extensive remodeling was done to large portions of the theater, including a modified marquee.  The ceiling illustrations are to be painted over but photographed and displayed along with antique equipment from the building.

Notes

References

1938 establishments in Washington (state)
Chehalis, Washington
Cinemas and movie theaters in Washington (state)
Art Deco architecture in Washington (state)